The Creole cuisine of Réunion is the food, culinary technique and typical dishes of the island of Réunion, France's dependency in the Indian Ocean. It is identified as Creole cuisine (in French, Créole) because it is a mixture of eating habits and colonial culinary customs with native ingredients. It is strongly influenced by Malagasy cuisine (from Madagascar), as well as other cuisines from East Africa. It also incorporates elements of French cuisine, due to colonization, as well as more recently Indian and Chinese, brought by Indian and Chinese immigrants respectively. The reunited diet is naturally spicy, flavorful, and relatively consistent.

Appetizers 

In La Reunion, the aperitif (appetizer) or entrée plays an important role as an integral part of a meal. Fries are especially popular, although there are notable exceptions such as steamed bouchons. Some typical snacks are:

 Samosas, a fried dumplings with a multitude of different fillings typical of the Middle East.
 The bonbon piment ("bonbon enchilado"), fried salty and spicy cookies
 The bouchon, a kind of dumpling of Chinese origin and stuffed with minced meat. They are served with siaw (soy sauce). Also typical is the bouchon sandwich
 The pain bouchon.
 The stuffed pepper peanuts, a simple popular snack
 Chicken croquette

Dishes 

Always accompanied by white rice, the most common dishes are curry (a local version of the Indian curry), rougail and jugged meats (civets in French). Curry consists of a base of onion, garlic and spices such as turmeric (called safran péï on the island), in which fish, meat, eggs; and finally tomato. Dishes can also be optionally flavored with ginger. Combava zest is also very popular. Chop suey (rice, not pasta) and other Asian dishes like pork with pineapple are also very common.

It is almost always served with some type of legume (grains), such as broad beans, locust beans or the famous lentils from Cilaos, for example. Also with cooked vegetables (brèdes) or raw, such as bleda (also called yerba de Pará, paracres or morning bleda).

Other common garnishes are pickles, rougail (a mixture of chopped tomato, onion, chili, and ginger) or fresh tomatoes, aubergines, or green mango, all highly seasoned.

A popular dish is rougail saucisses, made with rougail chicken or pork sausage, a tomato sauce, chili, spices, and ginger. It will preferably be accompanied by white or zembrocal rice (rice cooked with turmeric, which incorporates red beans or peas). You can also choose a goat or chicken massalé. Being an island, fresh and good quality fish are readily available. With cod you can also make the rougail morue.

In general, vegetarian dishes are rare in the Reunion diet, although there are choices, such as gratin de chouchou (chayote gratin). Various kinds of poultry are consumed. Although there are others; one of the local specialties is the civet de tenrec. The traditional way of preserving meat is boucanage, and cooking is done in cast iron pots. Traditionally, the main course was also prepared in the patio, over a wood fire, or in a small out-of-home unit, called the boucan. Then it was eaten on a banana leaf and often eaten by hand.

Cari tangue

Although the inhabitants of Reunion largely share a common way of life and eating habits, there are differences within the various communities that exist. For example, Réunion Muslims (Arabians) do not eat pork (see: Diet in Islam) and therefore do not consume rougail sausage, however they do tend to share more recipes with neighboring Mauritius, such as the briani. The Petit blancs des hauts, a Réunion ethnic group traditionally considered to be lower-class, consume small pickles or curry spices, unlike malbares (Indian community).

Drinks 

An aperitif or snack is usually accompanied by a punch (blow) or also, an "arranged rum" (rhum arrangé). It is a white rum that usually carries some fruit (lychee, mango, pineapple ...), leaves and / or seeds macerated for weeks. It is taken at any time of the day, even in the morning.

Another typical drink is tamarind syrup. The sodas made from pineapple, lychee, lemon ... produced on the island are also popular, although sometimes they are replaced by international drinks that are on the market.

In Réunion a wine is produced, the Cilaos. It is red, white or rosé and the dominant varieties are pinot noir, malbec and chenin. It comes from Cilaos, in the mountainous area of the island and its production is very low (14 ha).

Desserts 
Seasonal fruits are a very common and simple dessert: in the summer mangoes, lychees, longuians and Victoria type pineapple, a sweet variety from nearby Mauritius; And in winter, guava from Peru.

In pastry, the gâteau patate ("potato pie"), the gâteau ti'son (corn pie), the seasonal fruit tart, the beignets de bananes ("banana fritters") are famous. Starch cakes, cassava, yams, and even sweet potatoes are also common.

Special occasions 
For the New Year, typical pâté créole (Creole pate), whose filling is made of pork curry, called godivo, the dough is a mixture of curry sauce with flour and lard, and flavored with turmeric, accompanied by a little anise liqueur.

References 
 Cuisine réunionnaise | Habiter La Réunion» (en francés). Retrieved on January 3, 2020.
 Marie Valentin, La Cuisine réunionnaise, Fondation pour la recherche et le développement dans l'océan Indien, 1982, 133 p.
 Claire Secondy et Véronique Fontaine, Recettes réunionnaises et alimentation équilibrée, Orphie, 2007, 157 p..

External links 

Réunionnais culture